Delbert L. Bristol (September 20, 1918 – April 3, 1980) served as an Aviation Artillery Officer attached to the II Corps during World War II and was the first such officer to create a Corps level Air Artillery staff. His negotiations during the transition of the Army Air Corps into the United States Air Force assisted in the establishment of the Army's organic aviation efforts following the separation. He was inducted in the Army Aviation Hall of Fame in 1976.

References

1918 births
1990 deaths
United States Army personnel of World War II
United States Army personnel of the Korean War
United States Army personnel of the Vietnam War
United States Army colonels